Battle of Ohio may refer to:
 Battle of Ohio (MLB), a baseball rivalry between the Cleveland Indians and the Cincinnati Reds
 Battle of Ohio (NFL), American football rivalry between the Cleveland Browns and the Cincinnati Bengals
 See the Battle for Ohio (Revolutionary War), 1785–1795, in the American Revolution